Whiz Kids, or variants, may refer to:

 Whiz kid, a child prodigy, a child who produces meaningful output in some domain to the level of an adult expert performer

Film, television and games 
 Wiz Kid, Taki Matsuya, a fictional mutant character in Marvel Comics
 Whiz Kids (TV series), American science fiction adventure television series 1983
 Wizkid: The Story of Wizball II, a 1992 video game developed by Sensible Software

Music
 Wizkid, Ayodeji Ibrahim Balogun (born 1990), a Nigerian singer and songwriter
 The Whizz Kids, a New Zealand pop/rock band
 Whiz Kids (album), by Gary Burton, 1986

Sports
 Whiz Kids (baseball), the 1950 Philadelphia Phillies baseball team
 Whiz Kids, the 1942–43 Illinois Fighting Illini men's basketball team

Other
 WizKids, collectible miniatures games developer and publisher
 Whiz Kids (Ford), a group of post-World War II Ford Motor Company executives
 Whiz Kids (Department of Defense), a group of experts for RAND Corporation
 WhizzKids United a South African youth HIV / AIDS prevention, care, treatment and support programme
 Whizzkid's Guide, books by magician Peter Eldin
 Suzuki Cervo SC100 was known in England by the nickname "Whizzkid"

See also
 WHIZ (disambiguation)